Torsin-1A-interacting protein 1 is a protein that in humans is encoded by the TOR1AIP1 gene. More commonly known as lamina associated polypeptide 1 (LAP1), it is a type II integral membrane protein that resides in the inner nuclear membrane. The luminal domain of LAP1 interacts with Torsin A and is necessary for the ATPase activity of Torsin A. LAP1 plays a critical role in skeletal and heart muscle. Mutations in TOR1AIP1 have been linked to muscular dystrophy and cardiomyopathy. It's deletion from mouse hepatocytes leads to defected very-low density lipoprotein secretion and causes non-alcoholic fatty liver disease and non-alcoholic steatohepatitis

References

Further reading